Michel Lafranceschina (born 28 February 1939) is a French former footballer and coach.
He played for Grenoble, Lens, Lille, Sochaux, Limoges and Bourges.

After his playing career, he became a coach with Grenoble.

External links and references

Profile

1939 births
Living people
French footballers
Grenoble Foot 38 players
RC Lens players
Lille OSC players
FC Sochaux-Montbéliard players
Limoges FC players
Bourges 18 players
Ligue 1 players
Ligue 2 players
French football managers
Grenoble Foot 38 managers
Association football forwards